West Branch Area School District is a mid-sized, rural, public school district located in Morrisdale, Clearfield County, and Clinton County, Pennsylvania. The district is one of the 500 public school districts of Pennsylvania. West Branch Area School District was created in 1958 by the joining of Cooper Township High School and Morris Township High School. The district also includes Karthaus Township and Graham Township. The district extends across the Clearfield County's eastern border to include West Keating Township in Clinton County. According to 2000 federal census data, it served a resident population of 7,833. By 2010, the district's population was 7,857 people. The educational attainment levels for the school district population (25 years old and over) were 85% high school graduates and 9.3% college graduates. In 2009, West Branch Area School District residents' per capita income was $15,055, while the median family income was $37,054 a year. In the Commonwealth, the median family income was $49,501 and the United States median family income was $49,445, in 2010.

Per Distr
West Branch Area School District operates three schools: West Branch Area Elementary School, West Branch Middle School,and West Branch Area Senior High School. All of the schools reside in a conjoined building. The current school building was completed in 1964, with an addition to the high school that was finished in 2005. High school students may choose to attend Clearfield County Career and Technology Center for training in the construction and mechanical trades; Architectural Drafting & Design Technology; Allied Health Services; Cosmetology; and Culinary Arts & Food Management. The Central Intermediate Unit # 10 provides the district with a wide variety of services like specialized education for disabled students and hearing, speech and visual disability services and professional development for staff and faculty.

Superintendent- Micki Dutrow 
High School Principal- Joeseph Holenchick
Middle School Principal- Mark Mitchell 
Elementary Principle - Brandi O’hare

Extracurriculars
West Branch Area School District offers a variety of clubs, activities and sports.

Athletics
West Branch's mascot is the Warrior. Their team motos are "Warrior Power" and "Warrior Pride". They participate in the PIAA District 6 with Single-A classification in all but wrestling and baseball, where they compete in Double-A. Noteworthy athletic achievements include five PIAA individual state champions in wrestling (Jerry White, Robert English, Justin Owens, Jared Ricotta & Reynold 'Buzzy' Maines), winning a district championship in football in 1988, a district championship in baseball, a team district duals championship in wrestling, and other various conference championships. Former Warrior baseball players Ed Veres and John Prestash were selected in the Major League Baseball Draft straight out of high school. Larry Beightol, a former football player at West Branch, is an offensive line coach in the NFL, most recently working with the Detroit Lions. Wrestling State Champion Jared Ricotta, after starting four years for the Duquesne Dukes Division I Wrestling Team and capturing three Northeast Regional Titles was recruited by NASCAR's Hendrick Motorsports as a professional tire changer.

Starting in fall 2010, West Branch and local school Philipsburg-Osceola School District agreed to a co-op boys soccer program. Any 9-12th grade boy wishing to play soccer now plays with the Philipsburg Soccer team.

The district funds

Varsity

Boys
Baseball - AA
Basketball- AA
Cross country - A
Football - A
Soccer - AA
Track and field - AA
Wrestling - AA

Girls
Basketball - A
Cross country - A
Soccer - A
Softball - A
Track and field - AA
Volleyball - A

Junior high middle school sports

Boys
Basketball
Football
Wrestling 

Girls
Basketball
Softball

According to PIAA directory July 2013

References

External links

School districts in Clearfield County, Pennsylvania
Clearfield County, Pennsylvania
Education in Clearfield County, Pennsylvania
School districts in Clinton County, Pennsylvania
Education in Clinton County, Pennsylvania
Clinton County, Pennsylvania